Tofangoceras is a genus of pseudorthoceroid cephalopods from the Middle Ordovician of the USA (NY) and Asia (S. Manchuria, Korea, and Siberia) belonging to the Stereoplasmoceratidae and similar to Stereoplansmoceras.

The shell of Tofangoceras is long, straight, and faintly annulated, less strongly than for Stereoplasmoceras. The siphuncle is central with moderately expanded, spindle-like segments. Aperture unknown.

References

 Walter C. Sweet, 1964. Nautiloidea - Orthocerida; Treatise on Invertebrate Paleontology, Part K mollusca 3. Geological Society of America and University of Kansas Press.

Prehistoric nautiloid genera
Ordovician cephalopods of North America
Ordovician cephalopods of Asia